Iapa or IAPA may refer to:
 Iapa, a village in Sighetu Marmației municipality, northern Romania
 Iapa (Bistrița), river in eastern Romania
 Iapa, a tributary of the Someș in northwestern Romania
 Illinois Academy of Physician Assistants
 Institute of Analytics Professionals of Australia
 Inter American Press Association

See also 
 Yapa (disambiguation)
 Lapa (disambiguation)